Kiełpino  (German: Kölpin) is a village in the administrative district of Gmina Borne Sulinowo, within Szczecinek County, West Pomeranian Voivodeship, in north-western Poland.

For the history of the region, see History of Pomerania.

The village has an approximate population of 100.

References

Villages in Szczecinek County